El Raval is a neighborhood in the Ciutat Vella district of Barcelona, the capital city of Catalonia. The neighborhood, especially the part closest to the old port, was formerly (informally) known as Barri Xinès or Barrio Chino, meaning "Chinatown". El Raval is one of the two historical neighborhoods that border La Rambla, the other being the Barri Gòtic; it contains some 50,000 people.

An area historically infamous for its nightlife and cabarets, as well as prostitution and crime, El Raval has changed significantly in recent years and due to its central location has become a minor attraction of Barcelona. It currently has a very diverse immigrant community (47.4% of its population was born abroad, ranging from Filipinos, South Americans, and Pakistanis, to a more recent Eastern European community, especially from Romania). It is home to many bars, restaurants, and night spots.

Delimitations
The northern border of the neighborhood is marked by Plaça Catalunya and Plaça Universitat, and the street which connects them, Carrer de Pelai. It ends in the east with La Rambla, and in the west and south, the neighborhood is delimited by Ronda Sant Antoni, Ronda Sant Pau and Avinguda del Paral·lel.

Crime 
El Raval is one of Barcelona's most dangerous neighborhoods, with frequent robberies. There is substantial police concern about drug crime and fighting. The police have been struggling to control the use and sale of heroin in the neighborhood where it has taken a foothold among marginalized residents. 40% of the residents of the Raval live at risk of social exclusion.

Landmarks
There are a few historical monuments such as the Monastery of Sant Pau del Camp, as well as newer additions such as the Rambla del Raval, and the MACBA (the Contemporary Art Museum of Barcelona) or the Centre de Cultura Contemporània de Barcelona. Near the museum is the mural Todos Juntos Podemos Parar el SIDA, originally created by American artist Keith Haring in 1989.

In the southern part of the neighborhood an old wall and gate of the medieval city called Portal de Santa Madrona still exists as part of the Maritime Museum. The Raval is also known for its large statue of a cat by Fernando Botero, located on the Rambla del Raval. The city's most famous market, La Boqueria, is also situated in the Raval.

In the eastern part of the neighborhood, Antoni Gaudí's Palau Güell is located on the Carrer Nou de la Rambla.

Transport

Barcelona Metro
Drassanes (L3)
Liceu (L3)
Paral·lel (L2, L3)
Sant Antoni (L2)

Cultural depictions
Josep Maria de Sagarra's 1932 book Vida Privada
Rafael Gil's 1948 film La calle sin sol
Jean Genet's 1949 book, The Thief's Journal (Journal du Voleur)
Joan Colom's photos of the neighborhood in the 1950s
Eduardo Mendoza's 1975 book La verdad sobre el caso Savolta
Terenci Moix's 1976 book La caiguda de l'imperi sodomita
José Antonio de la Loma's 1977 film Las alegres chicas de El Molino
Ivà's comic strip Makinavaja, started in 1986.
Francisco Casavella's 1990 book El Triunfo
Maruja Torres's 1997 book Un calor tan cercano
Francisco Casavella's 1997 book Un enano español se suicida en Las Vegas
Roberto Bolaño's 1998 novel The Savage Detectives
José Luis Guerin's 2001 documentary En construcción
Carlos Ruiz Zafón's 2001 novel The Shadow of the Wind
Francisco Casavella's 2002-2003 book trilogy El día del Watusi
Cesc Gay's 2003 film En la ciudad
Pau Miró's 2004 play Llueve en Barcelona
Joaquim Jordà's 2005 film De nens
Juan Marsé's 2005 book Canciones de amor en Lolita's Club
Mireia Ros's 2005 film El Triunfo
 Ferran Aisa i Mei Vidal, 2006 book El Raval, un espail al marge
Antoni Verdaguer's 2006 film Raval, Raval...
Fernando Gómez's 2008 book El misterio de la Calle Poniente
Marc Pastor's 2009 book La mala dona
Francesc Betriu's 2009 documentary Mónica del Raval
Jo Sol's 2009 film The Runner's Salary
Javier Calvo's 2009 novel Corona de Flores
Maruja Torres's 2009 book Esperadme en el cielo
Alejandro González Iñárritu's 2010 film Biutiful
Javier Zuloaga's 2011 novel Librería Libertad
Mathias Énard's 2012 novel Rue des voleurs
Xavier Artigas and Xapo Ortega's 2014 documentary Ciutat morta

People from Raval
Enriqueta Martí, serial killer known as the Vampyre of Barcelona.
Terenci Moix, writer.
Peret, singer.
Maruja Torres, writer.
Manuel Vázquez Montalbán, writer.
 Andreu Jacob, film music composer

See also
Carrer de Joaquín Costa, a street in Raval.
La Paloma
Pakistanis in Spain

 Urban planning of Barcelona

References

External links
Ravalnet.org
El Raval Solidari
Fundació Tot Raval
Casal dels Infants del Raval
Ravalear: guide to visit "el Raval" day and night

 
Raval, el
Raval, el
Little Pakistans
Entertainment districts in Spain
Restaurant districts and streets in Spain
Red-light districts in Spain